Eoin Ó Broin (born 1972) is an Irish Sinn Féin politician and Dáil deputy for Dublin Mid-West

Eoin Ó Broin or Eoin O'Broin may also refer to:
 Eoin O'Broin, stage name Noisestorm, Irish DJ and music producer
 Eoin Ó Broin, Irish Social Democrat (formerly independent) politician and member of South Dublin County Council

See also
 John O'Byrne (1884–1954) Irish barrister and judge, and chair of the Irish Legal Terms Advisory Committee